The  is a manually driven rubber-tyred people mover system in Saitama Prefecture, Japan, operated by .

The   that runs north from Ōmiya Station in Saitama, Saitama, alongside the Tohoku Shinkansen and Joetsu Shinkansen elevated high-speed lines through Ageo to Uchijuku Station in Ina in Saitama Prefecture in the Greater Tokyo Area is the only route that is run on the system. The line is double tracked from Ōmiya Station to Maruyama Station and single tracked from Maruyama to Uchijuku Station.

Saitama New Urban Transit is a kabushiki gaisha whose major shareholders include the East Japan Railway Company, Tobu Railway, banks, Saitama prefectural government, and the cities and the town served.

Ina Line stations
The stations on the line are as follows. All stations are located in Saitama Prefecture.

The line's depot is located next to Maruyama Station.

Rolling stock
, the following train types are used on the line, all formed as six-car sets.

 1050 series
 2000 series
 2020 series (since 4 November 2015)

1050 series
, two 1050 series sets (52 and 53) were in service, formed as six-car sets as follows.

2000 series
The 2000 series fleet consists of seven six-car sets (01 to 07) formed as follows. The trains have stainless steel bodies with different colour front ends and bodyside stripes.

2020 series
The 2020 series fleet consists of five six-car sets (21 to 25) formed as follows. Built by Mitsubishi Heavy Industries, the trains have aluminium bodies. Each set has a different accent colour, as shown below.

The first 2020 series trainset, numbered 21, entered service on 4 November 2015. Set 22 entered service in February 2016, followed by set 23 in June 2016. A fourth trainset, numbered 24, entered service on 12 February 2019.

Former rolling stock
 1010 series

By 1 April 2015, three 1010 series sets (15, 17, 19) remained in service, formed as six-car sets. The last set (set 7) was withdrawn following its last day in service on 26 June 2016.

History
The people of Ina town, on the branch point of the Tohoku and Joetsu Shinkansen high-speed railway lines, opposed the latter being routed through their area, complaining that the town would be divided by the new tracks and beset with noise pollution. To placate the residents, new railway lines were planned. The AGT Ina Line was the solution reached for the area north of Ōmiya Station, where the potential demand was not large enough to run heavy rail lines economically. (Currently, the line generates an operating profit.) A heavy rail line (the Saikyo Line) was the solution reached for the south of Ōmiya Station.

 1 April 1980: Operating company  is incorporated. 
 22 December 1983: The section between Ōmiya and Hanuki stations opens.
 2 August 1990: The remaining section between Hanuki and Uchijuku stations opens.
 14 October 2007: Ōnari Station is renamed Tetsudō-Hakubutsukan Station when the Railway Museum (Tetsudō-Hakubutsukan) opens.

See also
 List of rapid transit systems

References

External links

  

People mover systems in Japan
Rail transport in Saitama Prefecture
Railway lines opened in 1983
1983 establishments in Japan